The 2004 National Midget Championship was Canada's 26th annual national midget 'AAA' hockey championship, played April 18–25, 2004 at Kenora, Ontario.  The Brandon Wheat Kings defeated the Riverains du Collège Charles-Lemoyne 2-1 in overtime to win their first and only national title.  It also marked the first time that a Manitoba team was the national midget champion.

This was the only season that Hockey Canada did not have a sponsor for the national midget championship.  From 1979 to 2003, it was known as the Air Canada Cup.  Later in 2004, a new sponsor would be found and the midget championship would be renamed the Telus Cup.

Teams

Round robin

Standings

Scores

Red Deer 6 - Brandon 5 (OT)
Collège Charles-Lemoyne 5 - Cornwall 2
Toronto 5 - Kenora 1
Collège Charles-Lemoyne 5 - Brandon 4 (OT)
Red Deer 3 - Toronto 1
Kenora 5 - Cornwall 2
Collège Charles-Lemoyne 6 - Toronto 2
Brandon 5 - Cornwall 3
Red Deer 4 - Kenora 1
Cornwall 7 - Toronto 5
Collège Charles-Lemoyne 5 - Red Deer 3
Brandon 0 - Kenora 0
Red Deer 3 - Cornwall 2 (OT)
Brandon 4 - Toronto 3
Collège Charles-Lemoyne 8  - Kenora 1

Playoffs

Semi-finals
Collège Charles-Lemoyne 2 - Kenora 1
Brandon 6 - Red Deer 2

Bronze-medal game
Red Deer 5 - Kenora 2

Gold-medal game
Brandon 2 - Collège Charles-Lemoyne 1 (OT)

Individual awards
Most Valuable Player: Francis Paré (Collège Charles-Lemoyne)
Top Scorer: Francis Paré (Collège Charles-Lemoyne)
Top Forward: Tyler Dittmer (Brandon)
Top Defenceman: Jeff Termineski (Toronto)
Top Goaltender: Tyler Gordon (Kenora)
Most Sportsmanlike Player: Kyle Dorowicz (Red Deer)

See also
Telus Cup

References

External links
2004 National Midget Championship Home Page
Hockey Canada-Telus Cup Guide and Record Book

Telus Cup
Midget Championship
Sport in Kenora
April 2004 sports events in Canada
Ice hockey competitions in Ontario
2004 in Ontario